Black, Brown and Beige is a 1958 jazz album by Duke Ellington and his orchestra, featuring Mahalia Jackson.

The album is a recording of a revised version of Ellington's Black, Brown and Beige suite. After a disappointing critical response to its first performance in 1943, Ellington divided the three-part suite into six shorter sections, leaving in "Come Sunday" and "Work Song", and it is this version that is recorded here.

Track listing 
All tracks by Duke Ellington

"Part I" – 8:17
"Part II" – 6:14
"Part III" (a.k.a. Light) – 6:26
"Part IV" (a.k.a. Come Sunday) – 7:58
"Part V" (a.k.a. Come Sunday) – 3:46
"Part VI" (23rd Psalm) – 3:01
Bonus tracks on re-releases
"Track 360" (a.k.a. Trains) (alternative take) – 2:02
"Blues in Orbit" (a.k.a. Tender) (alternative take) – 2:36
"Part I" (alternative take) – 6:49
"Part II" (alternative take) – 6:38
"Part III" (alternative take) – 3:08
"Part IV" (alternative take) – 2:23
"Part V" (alternative take) – 5:51
"Part VI" (alternative take) – 1:59
"Studio conversation" (Mahalia Swears) – 0:07
"Come Sunday" (a cappella) – 5:47
"(Pause track)" – 0:06

Personnel 
Duke Ellington – piano
Cat Anderson, Shorty Baker, Clark Terry – trumpet
Ray Nance – trumpet & violin
Quentin Jackson, Britt Woodman – trombone
John Sanders – valve trombone
Jimmy Hamilton – clarinet
Bill Graham – alto saxophone (subbing for Johnny Hodges)
Russell Procope – clarinet & alto saxophone
Paul Gonsalves  – tenor saxophone
Harry Carney – baritone saxophone
Jimmy Woode – bass
Sam Woodyard – drums
Mahalia Jackson – vocals

References 

1958 albums
Big band albums
Swing albums
Duke Ellington albums
Mahalia Jackson albums
Columbia Records albums
Albums produced by Irving Townsend